Saint-Léger-du-Malzieu (Auvergnat: Sent Latgièr del Malasiu) is a commune in the Lozère department in southern France.

See also
Communes of the Lozère department

References

Saintlegerdumalzieu